The Youth Challenge Program is a program for at-risk youth run by the National Guard of the United States, which consists of Youth Challenge Academies (known as YCA's) in each participating state. The stated mission of the Youth Challenge Program is "to intervene in and reclaim the lives of at-risk youth to produce program graduates with the values, skills, education and self-discipline necessary to succeed as adults." The program accepts 16- to 18-year-old male and female high school dropouts who are drug-free and not in trouble with the law.  The program lasts for 17½ months.  The first 5½ months are part of the quasi-military Residential Phase.  The last 12 months are part of the Post-Residential Phase.  Most participants will earn their GED or a high school diploma by the end of their Residential Phase.

The program is one of many programs administered by the National Guard Bureau that address leadership, life skills, and physical training.

Phases

Acclimation Phase
The program begins with a 2-week Acclimation Phase where candidates can adjust to the physical, mental, and disciplined aspects of the program. At the end of the Acclimation Phase, candidates graduate to cadets and begin the Residential Phase of the program.

Residential Phase
The Residential Phase is a 22-week long phase and the main phase of the Youth Challenge Program. During the Residential Phase, Cadets will attend school, participate in physical training, learn the values of discipline and teamwork, and explore numerous career opportunities.

Post Residential Phase
The Post Residential Phase is a 12-month period that focuses on placement. Cadets must secure positive placement via a job, returning to high school, enrolling in college or a trade program, enlist in the military, or volunteer at least 30 hours a week. Cadets are also expected to maintain contact with their mentor and the program placement staff.

Participating states and territories
The following is a list of states who participate in the Youth Challenge Program. Some states have multiple campuses; for example, Georgia has a YCA at both Ft. Stewart and Ft. Gordon, but both fall under the same state director.
Alaska
Arkansas
California
District of Columbia
Florida
Georgia
Hawaii
Idaho
Illinois
Indiana
Kentucky
Louisiana
Maryland
Michigan
Mississippi
Montana
Nevada
New Jersey
New Mexico
North Carolina
Oklahoma
Oregon
Puerto Rico
South Carolina
Tennessee
Texas
Virginia
Washington
West Virginia
Wisconsin
Wyoming

Related Programs by the National Guard
Partners in Education
HUMVEE School Program
YOU CAN School Program
Guard Fit Challenge
Heritage Outreach Program
ASVAB Career Exploration Program
GED Plus Program
About Face
Forward March
National Guard Drug Demand Reduction Program

Gallery

See also
Civil Air Patrol
Exploring (Learning for Life)
Junior Reserve Officers' Training Corps
United States Naval Sea Cadet Corps
Young Marines

References

External links

Official National Guard Youth ChalleNGe Program Site
Official National Guard Youth Foundation Sites
Official Southern California Sunburst Youth ChalleNGe Academy Site
Official Idaho Youth ChalleNGe Academy Site
Official South Carolina Youth ChalleNGe Academy Site
Official Michigan Youth ChalleNGe Academy Site

National Guard (United States)
American military youth groups
Learning programs